Symphony No. 26 may refer to:

Symphony No. 26 (Haydn)
Symphony No. 26 (Michael Haydn)
Symphony No. 26 (Mozart)
Symphony No. 26 (Myaskovsky) by Nikolai Myaskovsky

026